The Crossett Post Office is a historic former post office and library building at 125 Main Street in Crossett, Arkansas.  The single story Art Deco building was built in 1940 as a Works Progress Administration project, and served as the town's post office until 1968.  In that year the federal government sold the building to the town for $1, and it was converted for use as a public library.  It served in that role until 2002, when the library relocated to new quarters.

The building was listed on the National Register of Historic Places in 2003.

See also 

National Register of Historic Places listings in Ashley County, Arkansas
List of United States post offices

References 

Post office buildings on the National Register of Historic Places in Arkansas
International style architecture in Arkansas
Government buildings completed in 1939
National Register of Historic Places in Ashley County, Arkansas
1939 establishments in Arkansas